Statistics of Austrian first league in the 1932–33 season.

Overview
It was contested by 12 teams, and First Vienna FC won the championship.

League standings

Results

References
Austria - List of final tables (RSSSF)

Austrian Football Bundesliga seasons
Austria
1932–33 in Austrian football